Every year, the International Astronautical Federation with the support of the International Academy of Astronautics and the International Institute of Space Law (IISL), holds the International Astronautical Congress (IAC) which is hosted by one of the national society members of the IAF.

They are an annual meeting of the actors in the discipline of space, and are generally held in late September or early October. They consist of plenary sessions, lectures and meetings. The IAC is attended by the agency heads and senior executives of the world's space agencies.

As the Second World War came to an end, the United States and the Soviet Union held different and competing political worldviews. As the Cold War began to take shape, communication between the two countries became less frequent. Both countries turned their focus to achieving military superiority over the other.

Six years after the Iron Curtain fell, the International Astronautical Federation (IAF) was formed by scientists from all over Europe in the field of space research in order to collaborate once more. During the years of the Space Race, the IAF was one of the few forums where members of both East and West Europe could meet during the annual International Astronautical Congresses.

Founding Organizations 
 Argentina: Sociedad Argentina Interplanetaria (Argentianian Interplanetary Society)
 Austria: Österreichische Gesellschaft für Weltraumforschung (Austrian Society for Space Research)
 France: Groupement Astronautique Français (French Astronautic Group)
 Germany: Gesellschaft für Weltraumforschung Stuttgart (Society for Space Research Stuttgart), Gesellschaft für Weltraumforschung Hamburg (Society for Space Research Hamburg)
 Italy: Associazione Italiana Razzi (Italian Rocket Association)
 Spain: Asociación Española de Astronáutica (Spanish Astronautical Association)
 Sweden: Svenska Interplanetariska Sällskapet (Swedish Interplanetary Society)
 Switzerland: Schweizerische Astronautische Arbeitsgemeinschaft (Swiss Astronautical Association)
 United Kingdom: British Interplanetary Society
 United States: American Rocket Society, Detroit Rocket Society, Pacific Rocket Society, Reaction Research Society

International Astronautical Federation Governance 
The International Astronautical Federation is a non-profit non-governmental organization created in 1951. Under French law, the IAF is defined as a federation of member organizations where a General Assembly is responsible for making decisions.

IAF General Assembly 
The IAF General Assembly is in charge of governing the Federation. Composed of delegates from every member organization, the assembly is responsible for voting to approve all major decisions regarding the Federation's rules and regulations as well as the acceptance of new member organizations. The General Assembly meets during the International Astronautical Congress.

IAF Bureau 
The IAF Bureau sets the agenda of the IAF General Assembly, including: review of new member candidates; supervision of IAF activities; and supervision of IAF accounts. It is made up of:

 The IAF President
 The Incoming IAF President
 The IAF Honorary Ambassador
 12 IAF Vice-Presidents
 The IAF Executive Director
 The IAF General Counsel
 The IAF Incoming General Counsel
 The IAF Honorary Secretary
 The President of the International Academy of Astronautics (IAA)
 The President of the International Institute of Space Law (IISL)
 Special Advisor to the President

IAF Secretariat 
This branch is in charge of running the administration of the Federation.

Locations of past and future International Astronautical Congresses (IAC)
International Astronautical Congresses are held in the late summer or fall months. In 2002 and 2012 the World Space Congress combined the IAC and COSPAR Scientific Assembly. The 2020 IAC was held virtually due to the global COVID pandemic.

See also 
 List of astronomical societies

References

External links

IAF
IAC 2012
IAC 2013
IAC 2013
IAC 2014
IAC 2015
IAC 2017

Astronomy organizations
Space advocacy organizations